The Wran ministry (1978–1980) or Second Wran ministry was the 72nd ministry of the New South Wales Government, and was led by the 35th Premier of New South Wales, Neville Wran, representing the Labor Party. It was the second of eight consecutive occasions when Wran was Premier.

Background
Wran had been elected to the Legislative Council of New South Wales by a joint sitting of the New South Wales Parliament on 12 March 1970. He was Leader of the Opposition in the Legislative Council from 22 February 1972. He resigned from the council on 19 October 1973 to switch to the Legislative Assembly, successfully contesting the election for Bass Hill, which he would hold until his retirement in 1986. Wran successfully challenged Pat Hills to become Leader of Labor Party and Leader of the Opposition from 3 December 1973 and became Premier following a narrow one seat victory at the 1976 election.

Labor had returned to government in 1976 after 11 years in opposition, following a narrow one seat victory at the 1976 election. 85% of voters approved a referendum in June 1978 to introduce direct elections for the Legislative Council. The election on 7 October 1978 was  a landslide victory for Labor, popularly known as the "Wranslide", with a swing to Labor of 9.1%, gaining 13 seats. The first election for the Legislative Council in  years saw Labor win nine of the 15 available seats, giving it a majority of four seats in the council.

Composition of ministry
The composition of the ministry was announced by Premier Wran and sworn in on 19 October 1978. Former Premier and minister, Jack Renshaw, announced his decision to retire from politics in January 1980, with Wran assuming his portfolio of Treasurer pending a reconfiguration of the ministry on 29 February 1980 and the Third Wran ministry was formed.

First arrangement

 
Ministers are members of the Legislative Assembly unless otherwise noted.

See also

Members of the New South Wales Legislative Assembly, 1978–1981
Members of the New South Wales Legislative Council, 1978–1981

Notes

References

 

New South Wales ministries
1978 establishments in Australia
1980 disestablishments in Australia
Australian Labor Party ministries in New South Wales